Marko Vučković (some sources spell as Vukovic) was an American soccer defender who earned one cap with the U.S. national team in a 1–0 loss to Poland on August 12, 1973.  He came on for Bobby Smith in the 60th minute.   Vuckovic, and most of his team mates, were from the second division American Soccer League after the first division North American Soccer League refused to release players for the game.

References

External links

1950 births
Living people
American soccer players
Association football defenders
Vancouver Whitecaps (1974–1984) players
Minnesota Kicks players
Toronto Blizzard (1971–1984) players
American Soccer League (1933–1983) players
North American Soccer League (1968–1984) players
United States men's international soccer players